The Sella group (Ladin: Mëisules or L Sela) is a plateau-shaped massif in the Dolomites mountains of northern Italy. The Sella lies north of the Marmolada and to the east of the Langkofel.

The Sella lies between the four Ladin valleys of Badia, Gherdëina, Fascia, and Fodom and is divided between the provinces of South Tyrol, Trentino and Belluno. It can be driven around by car crossing the Campolongo Pass, Pordoi Pass, Sella Pass, and Gardena Pass. In winter it is possible to ski around the entire massif by using the Sella Ronda ski lift carousel. Also each winter the alpine touring ski Sellaronda Skimarathon race is held, which leads  around the entire Sella and covers 42 km of mountain trails. The same trails can be mastered by Mountain bike during the summer.

Other peaks in the massif are the Piz Pisciadù , the Boèseekofel , the four Sellatürme , Sass Pordoi , whose summit can be reached by funicular from Pordoi Pass, and Brunecker Turm . During winter the summit is the starting point for many alpine ski tours, of which the most famous are the descent through the Val Mesdì and the descent from the Pordoischarte.

Climate
The plateau of the Sella Group is characterized by a Tundra climate with average temperatures above 0 °C only during the summer months. Average data at the weather station on Piz Pisciadù at  measured between 2004 and 2020 shows that the average temperature in summer lies around +3 °C and +5 °C, while in winter it ranges between -8 and -10 °C.

Gallery

Maratona dles Dolomites
Each year the course of the annual single-day seven mountain passes crossing Maratona dles Dolomites Bicycle Race goes around the Sella group.

References

External links

360-degree panorama of the Sella Group, Marmolada and Fedaia lake
360-degree panorama of the Sella Group from Cima Rocca

Mountain ranges of the Alps